No. 1 Remote Sensor Unit (1RSU), formerly known as No. 1 Radar Surveillance Unit, was renamed on 2 May 2015. 1RSU is the Royal Australian Air Force unit responsible for operating the Jindalee Operational Radar Network (JORN) and a number of space sensor systems. 1RSU is located at RAAF Base Edinburgh, Adelaide, South Australia.

1RSU was established on 1 July 1992 to operate the initial JORN site at Alice Springs and moved to RAAF Base Edinburgh in 1999. The JORN sites at Longreach and Laverton were commissioned in mid-2003. In addition to the JORN sites, 1RSU operates the JORN Coordination Centre at RAAF Base Edinburgh, which is responsible for providing JORN data to the system's 'customers', which include the Australian Strategic Theatre Joint Intelligence Centre and Northern Command.

1RSU is the first space operations unit in the Australian Defence Force. The unit remotely operates the C-Band Space Surveillance Radar and Space Surveillance Telescope installed at Naval Communication Station Harold E. Holt in Exmouth, Western Australia. Collectively, these systems provide a space situational awareness capability, allowing the tracking of space assets and debris

See also
Space Delta 2
20th Space Control Squadron

Notes

References
 

1
Military units and formations established in 1992